Calycophyllum spruceanum, common name capirona, is a canopy tree indigenous from the Amazon rainforest.

Description 
A tree can grow up to a height of 30 meters.

During the summer months, it produces an abundance of white, aromatic flowers, which are followed by elongated seed pods with 3-5 seeds inside.

Its bark is shed periodically to avoid lichens, fungi, epiphytes and lianas.

Once or twice a year, it sheds off its bark entirely. The smooth green bark underneath is somewhat like a sunburnt human. The older the tree, the more of its bark will be unpeeled, creeping up its trunk. It grows white or green flowers between March and April. It fruits between July and November, seeds are dispersed by the wind and water. Its wood is used for parquet.

Uses 
The dried bark is used to treat fungus on the skin. Used also as an antidiabetic and for eye infections. This tree avoids lichens, fungi, epiphytes and lianas, by getting rid of its bark.

The plants grows extremely fast, within eight years. The wood is often cut for lumber.

Region of growth 
Calycophyllum spruceanum grows in the South American countries of Bolivia, Colombia, Brazil, Ecuador, and Peru.

References

Further reading

External links 
 Ayahuasca Foundation (Iquitos, Peru), capirona, Calycophyllum spruceanum
 Rain Tree (Milam County Texas USA), database file for mulateiro, Calycophyllum spruceanum

Dialypetalantheae
Plants described in 1889
Trees of Peru
Trees of Colombia
Trees of Ecuador
Trees of Brazil
Trees of Bolivia